The Argonaut Pirate was a 1930s, U.S., three place, single-engined pusher configuration amphibious aircraft. Only two were built.

Design and development

The H.20 Pirate was Argonaut aircraft's first product, flying in 1935. Its wire-braced high wing was rectangular in plan out to blunted tips. It had solid spruce spars and wooden ribs and was fabric-covered apart from plywood-covered leading edges. Its ailerons were relatively short but broad.

The hull was also wooden, a semi-monocoque structure with ply planking, ply frames and spruce stringers. It had a single step planing bottom. Pilot and co-pilot sat side by side in an enclosed cabin forward of the wing leading edge. The third seat was just behind them on the centreline and was more like a jump-seat than a true passenger seat. The H.20 Pirate's inverted, air-cooled,  Menasco C-4 was mounted close to the top of the fuselage above the wing, its four-bladed propeller just clearing the central wing trailing edge. The steel tube engine mounting ran down through the fuselage to the main landing gear mountings. The vertical tail was rather straight-edged in profile, with its tailplane mounted about halfway up carrying lobate plan elevators.

The Pirate was stabilized on water with a pair of rather bulky, flat-bottomed, strut-mounted floats at about two-thirds span. Its retractable landing gear was narrow track, with wheels on short, rubber ring-damped legs that were manually retracted into a horizontal position with a wheel in the cabin. The mainwheels had brakes and the tailwheel swivelled for ground manoeuvrability.

The Pirate prototype H.20 first flew in 1934. Its development programme was successfully concluded in late 1935; by then it was described more realistically as a two place aircraft. This programme led to a second aircraft, the H.24, intended as the production prototype. Long, V-form struts from the top of the engine mounting to the spars replaced the earlier wire bracing. More refined, V-bottom, floats were used. Its tail was revised with more rounded fixed surfaces and a deeper and more rounded rudder and the elevators had more area with only a small cut-out for rudder movement. These and other production aircraft related changes increased the empty weight of the H.24 by 45%. By 1937 it was once again described as a three-seater, though little is known about the cabin and there was no glazing aft of the cockpit. It was on display at the National Aviation Show held in New York from 28 January 1937 but no production followed.

Development continued after Argonaut's acquisition by the (Donald G) White Aircraft Co. in 1938, as the White A-R 3-seat amphibian and the White Gull 4-seat amphibian. Only a single White A-R was registered as NX77Y and further work was halted due to lack of market.

Specifications (H.24 Pirate)

See also

References

Amphibious aircraft
High-wing aircraft
Single-engined pusher aircraft
1930s United States sport aircraft
Aircraft first flown in 1935